Only Love is the third full-length album by American hardcore punk band The Armed. It was released April 27, 2018 for free via Bandcamp. It features drummer Ben Koller and was recorded and produced by Kurt Ballou at GodCity studio.

Track listing

References 

2018 albums
The Armed albums